List of town and villages in the Highlands of Scotland. This covers a wider area than just the Highland council area.

Aberfeldy, Perth and Kinross
Aboyne, Aberdeenshire
Achfary, Highland
Alness, Highland
Altnaharra, Highland
Applecross, Highland
Arisaig, Highland
Ardlui, Argyll and Bute, Loch Lomond and the Trossachs National Park 
Arrochar, Argyll and Bute, Loch Lomond and the Trossachs National Park 
Auchtubh, Stirling, Loch Lomond and the Trossachs National Park
Auldearn, Highland
Aultbea, Highland
Aviemore, Highland, Cairngorms National Park
Avoch, Highland
Back of Keppoch, Highland
Balintore, Highland
Ballachulish, Highland
Ballater, Aberdeenshire, Cairngorms National Park
Balloch, Highland
Balquhidder, Stirling, Loch Lomond and the Trossachs National Park
Banavie, Highland
Banchory, Aberdeenshire
Barcaldine, Argyll and Bute
Beauly, Highland
Bettyhill, Highland
Blair Atholl, Perth and Kinross, Cairngorms National Park
Blairgowrie, Perth and Kinross
Boat of Garten, Highland, Cairngorms National Park
Bonar Bridge, Highland
Braemar, Aberdeenshire, Cairngorms National Park
Braetongue, Highland
Bridge of Orchy, Argyll and Bute
Campbeltown, Argyll and Bute
Cannich, Highland
Carrbridge, Highland, Cairngorms National Park
Castlebay, Na h-Eileanan Siar
Castletown, Highland
Coldbackie, Highland
Colintraive, Argyll and Bute
Cammachmore, Aberdeenshire
Conon Bridge, Highland
Contin, Highland
Cookney, Aberdeenshire
Corpach, Highland
Craighouse, Argyll and Bute
Crieff, Perth and Kinross
Crianlarich, Stirling, Loch Lomond and the Trossachs National Park
Cromarty, Highland
Culbokie, Highland
Culloden, Highland
Dalmally, Argyll and Bute
Dalnaspidal, Perth and Kinross
Dalwhinnie, Highland, Cairngorms National Park
Dingwall, Highland
Dornie, Highland
Dornoch, Highland
Doune, Stirling
Drumbeg, Sutherland, Highland
Drumnadrochit, Highland
Dulnain Bridge, Highland, Cairngorms National Park
Dunbeath, Highland
Dunkeld, Perth and Kinross
Dunnet, Highland
Dunoon, Argyll and Bute
Durness, Highland
Elgin, Moray
Evanton, Highland
Edderton, Highland
Farr, Sutherland, Highland
Farr, Strathnairn, Highland
Forres, Moray
Fort Augustus, Highland
Fort William, Highland
Fortrose, Highland
Gairloch, Highland
Gillock, Highland
Glencoe, Highland
Glenelg, Highland
Glendaruel, Argyll and Bute
Golspie, Highland
Grantown-on-Spey, Highland, Cairngorms National Park
Glenfinnan, Highland
Halkirk, Highland
Helmsdale, Highland
Hilton, Highland
Inveraray, Argyll and Bute
Inverasdale, Wester Ross
Inverbeg, Argyll and Bute, Loch Lomond and the Trossachs National Park 
Invergordon, Highland
Invermoriston, Highland
Inverness. Highland 
Inveruglas, Argyll and Bute, Loch Lomond and the Trossachs National Park 
John o' Groats, Highland
Keiss, Highland
Killin, Stirling, Loch Lomond and the Trossachs National Park
Kilmartin, Argyll and Bute
Kiltarlity, Highland
Kingussie, Highland, Cairngorms National Park
Kinlochbervie, Highland
Kinlocheil, Highland
Kinlochleven, Highland
Kinlochewe, Highland
Kinloch Rannoch, Perth and Kinross
Kirkhill, Highland
Kyle of Lochalsh, Highland
Laggan, Highland, Cairngorms National Park
Lochailort, Highland
Lochcarron, Highland
Lochinver, Highland
Lochranza, North Ayrshire
Lochgoilhead, Argyll and Bute, Loch Lomond and the Trossachs National Park
Lochearnhead, Stirling, Loch Lomond and the Trossachs National Park 
Lochgilphead, Argyll and Bute
Lybster, Highland
Mallaig, Highland
Maryburgh, Highland
Maryculter, Aberdeenshire
Morar, Highland
Muchalls, Aberdeenshire
Muir of Ord, Highland
Nairn, Highland
Netherley, Aberdeenshire
Newtonmore, Highland, Cairngorms National Park 
North Connel, Argyll and Bute
North Ballachulish, Highland
Nethy Bridge, Highland, Cairngorms National Park
Oban, Argyll and Bute
Peterculter, Aberdeenshire
Pitlochry, Perth and Kinross
Plockton, Highland
Poolewe, Highland
Portmahomack, Highland
Reay, Highland
Rosemarkie, Highland
Rothes, Moray
Scourie, Highland
Shandwick, Highland
Shieldaig, Highland
South Ballachulish, Highland
Spean Bridge, Highland
Strathpeffer, Highland
Strathy, Highland
Strathyre, Stirling, Loch Lomond and the Trossachs National Park
Strontian, Highland
Stornoway, Na h-Eileanan Siar
Tain, Highland
Tarbet, Argyll and Bute, Loch Lomond and the Trossachs National Park
Tarbert-Harris, Na h-Eileanan Siar
Tarbert-Loch Fyne, Argyll and Bute
Taynuilt, Argyll and Bute
Thurso, Highland
Tighnabruaich, Argyll and Bute
Tobermory, Argyll and Bute
Tomintoul, Moray, Cairngorms National Park
Tongue, Highland
Torridon, Highland
Tullich, Aberdeenshire
Tyndrum, Stirling, Loch Lomond and the Trossachs National Park
Ullapool, Highland 
Udny Station, Aberdeenshire
Watten, Highland
Whaligoe, Highland
Wick, Highland

References

Geography of Highland (council area)
Lists of places in Scotland
Populated places in Scotland